The Richardson Highway is a highway in the U.S. state of Alaska, running 368 miles (562 km) and connecting Valdez to Fairbanks. It is marked as Alaska Route 4 from Valdez to Delta Junction and as Alaska Route 2 from there to Fairbanks. It also connects segments of Alaska Route 1 between the Glenn Highway and the Tok Cut-Off. The Richardson Highway was the first major road built in Alaska.

History 

A pack trail from the port at Valdez to Eagle, a distance of about 409 miles (660 km), was built in 1898 by the U.S. Army to provide an "all-American" route to the Klondike gold fields. After the rush ended, the Army kept the trail open in order to connect its posts at Fort Liscum, in Valdez, and Fort Egbert, in Eagle.

The Fairbanks gold rush in 1902, and the construction of a WAMCATS telegraph line along the trail in 1903, made the Valdez-to-Eagle trail one of the most important access routes to the Alaska Interior, so in 1910, the Alaska Road Commission upgraded it to a wagon road. The head of the project was U.S. Army General Wilds P. Richardson, for whom the highway was later named. During the construction, the government hired failed gold prospectors as well as regular construction workers. The income from this work allowed many of the prospectors to leave Alaska. Several roadhouses now on the National Register of Historic Places were constructed along the route at this time.

The rise of motorized travel led the road to be upgraded to automobile standards in the 1920s. To finance continued maintenance and road construction, the Alaska Road Commission instituted tolls for commercial vehicles in 1933 of up to $175 per trip, which were collected at the Tanana River ferry crossing at Big Delta. When the tolls were further increased in 1941 to boost business for the Alaska Railroad, disgruntled truckers nicknamed "gypsies" started a rogue ferry service in order to evade the toll.

The Alaska and Glenn highways, built during World War II, connected the rest of the continent and Anchorage to the Richardson Highway at Delta Junction and Glennallen respectively, allowing motor access to the new military bases built in the Territory just prior to the war: Fort Richardson in Anchorage, and Fort Wainwright adjacent to Fairbanks. The bridge at Big Delta, the last remaining gap, was built as part of the Alaska Highway project.

The southern end was only open during summers until 1950, when a freight company foreman who lived near the treacherous Thompson Pass plowed the snow himself for an entire season to prove the route could be used year-round. The highway was paved in 1957.

The Trans-Alaska Pipeline System, built in 1973-1977, mostly parallels the highway from Fairbanks to Valdez.

Recent and future improvements

  During the 1990s, the highway was upgraded from Fairbanks to the main gate at Eielson AFB, making this stretch a 4-lane divided road. Intersections with other roads, however, are still almost entirely at-grade.
  Under SAFETEA-LU, Alaska Route 2 from the Canadian border to Fairbanks, comprising parts of the Richardson and Alaska Highways, has been declared a High Priority Corridor (Corridor 67).  What this means for the distant future is not yet certain; although SAFETEA-LU does explicitly provide federal funds for upgrading the road to 4 lanes and divided, from Salcha to Delta Junction.

Interstate Highway System

Richardson Highway is part of the unsigned part of the Interstate Highway System east of Fairbanks. The entire length of Interstate A-2 follows Route 2 from the George Parks Highway (Interstate A-4) junction in Fairbanks to Tok, east of which Route 2 carries Interstate A-1 off the Tok Cut-Off Highway to the international border. Only a short piece of the Richardson Highway in Fairbanks is built to freeway standards.

Major intersections

References

External links

Evolution of the Richardson Highway - ExploreNorth
A journey down the Richardson Highway ; archive  from archive.org

Chugach Census Area, Alaska
Copper River Census Area, Alaska
Interstate Highways in Alaska
Southeast Fairbanks Census Area, Alaska
State highways in Alaska
Transportation in Fairbanks North Star Borough, Alaska
Transportation in Unorganized Borough, Alaska